Alleghany High School is the name of several schools in the United States:

Alleghany High School (North Carolina) 
Alleghany High School (Virginia)

See also
 Allegany High School
 Allegheny High School (disambiguation)